Robert Woods Spessard (December 11, 1915 – July 26, 1989) was an American basketball player known for his collegiate career at Washington and Lee University in the 1930s. He was a two-time NCAA All-American in 1937 and 1938 as well as a three-time first-team all-Southern Conference choice from 1936 to 1938.

He also coached his alma mater for the 1948–49 season, compiling a 10–12 record in his lone season.

References

1915 births
1989 deaths
All-American college men's basketball players
American men's basketball players
Basketball coaches from Virginia
Basketball players from Virginia
Centers (basketball)
Sportspeople from Roanoke, Virginia
Washington and Lee Generals football players
Washington and Lee Generals men's basketball coaches
Washington and Lee Generals men's basketball players